Rashid (also Romanized as Rāshid; also known as Rāshedī) is a village in Chenaneh Rural District, Fath Olmobin District, Shush County, Khuzestan Province, Iran. At the 2006 census, its population was 217, in 32 families.

References 

Populated places in Shush County